Alannah Beirne (born 6 November 1993) is an Irish fashion model and reality TV personality.

Career 

In 2017, Beirne competed in cycle 11 of Britain's Next Top Model hosted by Abbey Clancy. She reached the final and was last eliminated and in third place behind runner-up Jennifer Malengele and winner Olivia Wardell.

Dancing with the Stars 

In December 2017, was announced as contestant on the second series of the Irish version Dancing with the Stars. She was a last minute replacement for model and former Miss Ireland Aoife Walsh when Walsh sustained an injury forcing her to leave the competition before it started. She was paired with dancer Vitali Kozmin. Beirne and Kozmin became the sixth couple to be eliminated on 4 March 2018.

Dancing with the Stars performances

Personal life 
Beirne's mother, Brenda Hyland Beirne, was crowned the 1983 Rose of Tralee.

Beirne is the sister of Munster and Ireland rugby player, Tadhg Beirne.

References 

Irish female models
Living people
1993 births
Britain & Ireland's Next Top Model contestants